Hans-Jürgen Wallbrecht (8 August 1943 – 7 December 1970) was a German rower who was most successful in the eights. In this event he won a silver medal at the 1964 Summer Olympics, a world title in 1962, and three European titles in 1963–1965.

References

1943 births
1970 deaths
Olympic rowers of the United Team of Germany
Rowers at the 1964 Summer Olympics
Olympic silver medalists for the United Team of Germany
Olympic medalists in rowing
West German male rowers
Medalists at the 1964 Summer Olympics
World Rowing Championships medalists for West Germany
European Rowing Championships medalists
People from Neubrandenburg
Sportspeople from Mecklenburg-Western Pomerania